Myllykosken Pallo -47 (or MYPA, formerly MyPa) is a Finnish football club, based in the industrial village of Myllykoski, part of the city of Kouvola. The club temporarily shut down after having ceased operations in 2015 due to financial difficulties, but returned in 2017 earning a place in the fourth tier and won back-to-back promotions to reach the second division in 2019.

History
MyPa was founded in December 1947 in the village of Myllykoski in the then municipality of Sippola, which in 1975 became part of the town of Anjalankoski and since 2009 is part of Kouvola. Before that there had been some small-scale football culture in Myllykoski, so forming a football club was a natural step. The final move came from the local paper industry, which built a football pitch with spectator stands. MyPa was promoted to the highest tier in 1975, but the season ended in relegation.

Veikkausliiga
MyPa have played continuously in the Veikkausliiga since 1992. From 1993 to 1996 they were second four times in a row under the control of Harri Kampman. They won a first Finnish Cup in 1992, and a second in 1995. In 1997 Timo Liekoski was named as the manager of the club, but his employment lasted only one season. He was replaced by Juha Malinen. From 1999 to 2001 under the control of Malinen MyPa were third three times in a row, and finished second in 2002. After the 2003 season Malinen was replaced by Ilkka Mäkelä. Though dropping to 8th in the league, in 2004 MyPa won a third Finnish Cup, and the next season won their first Finnish championship. Mäkelä resigned during the 2007 season and the former assistant coach Janne Hyppönen became the new manager. Hyppönen was sacked in September 2008 and assistant Janne Lindberg took over in a caretaker capacity for the rest of the season. MYPA was denied league licence for the 2015 season due to financial troubles, and after having at first accepted a place in the second tier Ykkönen, finally withdrew from all professional football on 13 February 2015. MYPA made a return on the 2017 season earning a place from Inkeroisten Purha in the fourth tier due to Purha having difficulties gathering a team for the upcoming season.

International achievements
MyPa has participated in the UEFA Cup Winners' Cup, UEFA Cup and Intertoto Cup. It has faced many clubs like Boavista, PSV Eindhoven, Rapid București, Liverpool and Blackburn Rovers, as well as smaller clubs such as Dundee United. In 2005 they reached the first round of UEFA Cup but lost the decisive match against Swiss side Grasshoppers 1–4 on aggregate.

UEFA club competition record
Updated 14 February 2015.

Honours

 Veikkausliiga
 Winners (1):  2005
 Runners up (5):  1993, 1994, 1995, 1996, 2002
 Third place (3):  1999, 2000, 2001
 Ykkönen, I divisioona
 Winners (2):  1974, 1991 
 Kakkonen
 A-Group, Winners (1):  2018
 Kolmonen
 South-Eastern Group, Winners (1):  2017
 Finnish Cup
 Winners (3):  1992, 1995, 2004

Season to season

Players

Managers
 Harri Kampman (1991–96)
 Timo Liekoski (1997)
 Juha Malinen (1998–2003)
 Ilkka Mäkelä (Jan 2004 – Aug 2007)
 Janne Hyppönen (Aug 2007 – Sept 2008)
 Janne Lindberg (Sept 2008 – Dec 2010)
 Toni Korkeakunnas (Jan 2011 – Sept 2013)
 Antti Muurinen (Sept 2013 – Feb 2015)
 Jukka Karjalainen (Apr 2017 –)

References

External links
 Official website

 
Football clubs in Finland
Association football clubs established in 1947
Kouvola
1947 establishments in Finland